Great Guitars may refer to
 Great Guitars (band) jazz guitar supergroup
 Great Guitars (Great Guitars album) 1976 jazz album
 Great Guitars (Joe Louis Walker album) 1997 blues album